René Monteagudo Miranda (March 12, 1916 – September 14, 1973) was a Major League Baseball pitcher and outfielder who played with the Washington Senators (1938, 1940, 1944) and Philadelphia Phillies (1945). Monteagudo threw and batted left-handed.

Monteagudo was born in Havana, Cuba. Signed by the Senators, he debuted as a pitcher on September 6, 1938, but bothered by a sore arm, he switched to the outfield. In 1945, for the Phillies, he was the most used and most successful pinch-hitter in the league, going 18-for-52 (.346). He also pitched 14 games in relief. In 1946, Monteagudo was one of the ballplayers blackballed by Commissioner Happy Chandler after leaving the majors to play in the Mexican League.

In a four-season major league career, Monteagudo was a .289 hitter (78-for-270) with 21 RBI, 32 runs, nine doubles, one triple, and two stolen bases in 156 games. As a pitcher,  he posted a 3–7 record with 93 strikeouts, a 6.42 ERA, two saves, and 168 innings in 46 games (11 as a starter). René Monteagudo died in Hialeah, Florida at the age of 57.

His son Aurelio Monteagudo was a right-handed screwball pitcher who played in Major League Baseball and  Venezuelan Professional Baseball League.

See also
 List of second-generation Major League Baseball players
 List of Major League Baseball players from Cuba

External links

1916 births
1973 deaths
Leopardos de Santa Clara players
Major League Baseball outfielders
Major League Baseball pitchers
Major League Baseball players from Cuba
Cuban expatriate baseball players in the United States
Philadelphia Phillies players
Washington Senators (1901–1960) players